Myanmar is a Unicode block containing characters for the Burmese, Mon, Shan, Palaung, and the Karen languages of Myanmar, as well as the Aiton and Phake languages of Northeast India. It is also used to write Pali and Sanskrit in Myanmar.

Block 

The block has sixteen variation sequences defined for standardized variants.  They use  (VS01) to denote the dotted letters used for the Khamti, Aiton, and Phake languages.  (Note that this is font dependent.  For example, the Padauk font supports some of the dotted forms.)

History 
The following Unicode-related documents record the purpose and process of defining specific characters in the Myanmar block:

Historic and nonstandard uses of range 
In Unicode 1.0.0, part of the current Myanmar block was used for Tibetan. In Microsoft Windows, collation data referring to the old Tibetan block was retained as late as Windows XP, and removed in Windows 2003.

In Myanmar, devices and software localisation often use Zawgyi fonts rather than Unicode-compliant fonts. These use the same range as the Unicode Myanmar block (0x1000–0x109F), and are even applied to text encoded like UTF-8 (although Zawgyi text does not officially constitute UTF-8), despite only a subset of the code points being interpreted the same way. Zawgyi lacks support for Myanmar-script languages other than Burmese, but heuristic methods exist for detecting the encoding of text which is assumed to be Burmese.

References 

Unicode blocks